This is a list of 212 species in the genus Agonum.

Agonum species

References